ODI (formerly the 'Overseas Development Institute')  is a global affairs think tank, founded in 1960. Its mission is "to inspire people to act on injustice and inequality through collaborative research and ideas that matter for people and the planet." It does this through "research, convening and influencing, to lead new thinking and future agendas to deliver transformational change." Its Chair is Suma Chakrabarti.

History
In 1960 ODI began in small premises in Regent's Park, central London and operated a library devoted to international development issues as well as performing consultancy work and contracts with the Department for International Development (then known as the Overseas Development Agency) of the UK government.

Since 2004 it has had a Partnership Programme Arrangement with the Foreign, Commonwealth and Development Office. The institute also developed a strong focus on communications and 'bridging research and policy'.

In 2007 the ODI was named 'Think Tank of the Year' by Public Affairs News magazine. It was named 'Think-tank to Watch' in the Prospect 'Think-tank of the Year' awards in 2005 and is considered to be in international policy circles to be one of the world's leading think tanks on development.

It celebrated its 50th anniversary in 2010, with guests including former ODI Fellow and UK Business Secretary, Vince Cable.

Organisation
 ODI had more than 230 staff. The Chief Executive is Sara Pantuliano. Alex Thier was ODI Executive Director 2017 – 2019. From 2013 until 2016 it was directed by Kevin Watkins who took over from Dr Alison Evans, formerly of the Institute of Development Studies (IDS) at Sussex University. ODI does not engage in teaching.

As of 2021, ODI conducts research and convening in the following global affairs areas: 
 Climate and Sustainability
Development and Public Finance
Digital Societies
Equity and Social Policy
Gender Equality and Social Inclusion
Global Risks and Resilience
Humanitarian Policy 
Economic Development
Politics and Governance

Event series and publications
ODI hosts regular event series with conferences and panels discussing a wide range of development issues. Speakers include ODI staff, visiting development policymakers, DFID officials  and other prominent figures such as Justin Yifu Lin, the former World Bank Chief Economist, Julia Gillard, the 27th Prime Minister of Australia, and David Miliband, chief executive officer of the International Rescue Committee.

In 2020 ODI published 235 papers, research reports, briefings, case studies and analysis.  

ODI has two academic journals, Development Policy Review and Disasters.

Fellowship 
ODI runs a fellowship scheme, which sends young postgraduate economists of all nationalities to work in the public sectors of developing countries in sub-Saharan Africa, the Caribbean, South Asia, South East Asia and the Pacific on two-year contracts. Since 1963 ODI has sent over 1000 postgraduate economists to work in 40 mostly low-income countries. Participants were initially known as Overseas Development Institute Nuffield Fellows (ODINs) and later titled as ODI Fellows.

Funding
As a registered charity, ODI's income relies on "grants and donations from foundations, non-governmental organisations, the private sector, governments, multilateral agencies and academia".

Criticism
David Steven of Global Dashboard criticized the ODI for not making the distinction between subsidy and having a lower VAT rate on fuel comparison to other goods.

Selected publications 

 Interrogating the evidence base on humanitarian localisation, 2021

See also
Institute of Development Studies
Climate and Development Knowledge Network, run by an alliance of organisations that include ODI
Center for Global Development
Chatham House
Council on Foreign Relations

References

External links
 
 ODI Blog
  (publications fulltext)

1960 establishments in the United Kingdom
Development studies
Foreign policy and strategy think tanks based in the United Kingdom
Organisations based in the London Borough of Southwark
Think tanks based in the United Kingdom
Think tanks established in 1960